Aneesh Raman is Vice President and Head of The Opportunity Project at LinkedIn.  A former CNN war correspondent and speechwriter to President Barack Obama, Raman is an experienced communicator, focusing his career in recent years on the expansion of economic opportunity.  Prior to joining LinkedIn, Raman was a Senior Economic Advisor to California Governor Gavin Newsom. 

Raman has contributed to two books. He recounted his experience as the first Indian-American Presidential Speechwriter in West Wingers: Stories from the Dream Chasers, Change Makers, and Hope Creators Inside the Obama White House and authored a chapter in  My Life: Growing Up Asian in America, which was the first title released by the relaunched MTV Books. 

A graduate of Harvard College and a former Fulbright scholar, Raman is a member of the John F. Kennedy Presidential Library's New Frontier Award Committee and a Board Member at Shanti Bhavan school. He is a former term member at the Council on Foreign Relations.

CNN career

Raman started his career as an award-winning CNN war correspondent, becoming the network's first correspondent based in the Middle East responsible for region-wide coverage. At the time of his departure from CNN, Raman was based in Egypt but was largely responsible for coverage out of Iran. Over the course of a dozen trips, Raman reported extensively on Iran's nuclear ambitions and the growing frustration of the people towards their government.

From 2005 to 2006, Raman was CNN's Baghdad Correspondent, living in Iraq during an exceptionally volatile period in the Iraq War. In addition to embedding with US forces across the country, he provided some of the most comprehensive reporting on Iraq's National Assembly and the efforts to ratify a new constitution. Raman also provided in-depth coverage of the Saddam Hussein trial and was notably the first American television journalist to announce Saddam Hussein's execution. In 2014, Raman appeared on television a number of times to discuss the Islamic State of Iraq and the Levant's offensive in Iraq.

Raman's initial international posting was in Bangkok, Thailand, where he was the first Western reporter to go live from Phuket, Thailand after the 2004 Indian Ocean earthquake. Raman spent weeks covering the aftermath of the resulting tsunami and was part of the CNN team that won a 2005 Alfred I. duPont–Columbia University Award.

While at CNN, Raman reported from a number of countries including Iran, Iraq, Egypt, Lebanon, Syria, Saudi Arabia, Turkey, England, Spain, Nicaragua, India, Japan, Thailand, Cambodia, Singapore, Philippines and Indonesia. In July 2007, he gave a speech at the Clinton School of Public Service about his experiences as a foreign correspondent and the changes taking place in cable news.  Raman first appeared on CNN in 2004, when he profiled the younger generation and their involvement in the American 2004 presidential election. In June 2008, Raman left CNN and later joined the U.S. presidential campaign of Democrat Barack Obama.

He began his television career while in college, earning a local Emmy Award for anchoring Kids Talk Sports, a weekly sports talk show that aired on New England Cable News.

Obama Administration

After joining the presidential campaign of Barack Obama as part of the communications team set up for vice presidential nominee Joe Biden, Raman became speechwriter to Treasury Secretary Timothy Geithner during the 2008 financial crisis and ensuing recession.

Raman subsequently worked on strategic communications at The Pentagon before joining the White House staff as a Presidential Speechwriter, where he focused on domestic policy and was the principal speechwriter on immigration reform.

Tech Industry
Prior to working for the California Governor, Raman spent five years in the tech industry, including as Head of Economic Impact Policy at Facebook. Raman also was VP of Growth at RaiseMe, a social impact startup expanding access to higher education.,.

Personal life
Raman graduated from Harvard College magna cum laude and was a Fulbright Scholar.  He grew up in Wellesley, Massachusetts and went to Wellesley High School.

Raman married Dr. Haley Naik in 2012 after they were introduced to one another by a mutual friend.

References

American speechwriters
American writers of Indian descent
American male journalists
CNN people
Harvard College alumni
Obama administration personnel
People from Wellesley, Massachusetts
Year of birth missing (living people)
Living people
Wellesley High School alumni